The Riverview Historic District is a national historic district located at Norfolk, Virginia.  It encompasses 200 contributing buildings in a primarily residential section of Norfolk. It developed primarily during the first quarter of the 20th century, as a suburban community north of the growing downtown area of Norfolk.  The neighborhood includes notable examples of a variety of Late Victorian and Late 19th And 20th Century Revival styles.

Itlisted on the National Register of Historic Places in 1999.

References

Houses on the National Register of Historic Places in Virginia
Historic districts on the National Register of Historic Places in Virginia
National Register of Historic Places in Norfolk, Virginia
Victorian architecture in Virginia
Neighborhoods in Norfolk, Virginia
Houses in Norfolk, Virginia